The Macedonia Sailing Association is the national governing body for the sport of sailing in North Macedonia, recognised by the International Sailing Federation.

Famous Sailors

Olympic sailing

Yacht Clubs

References

External links
 Official website

Macedonia
Sailing